The Royal City of Dublin Hospital was a health facility on Baggot Street, Dublin, Ireland.

History
The hospital was first established by a group of doctors from the Royal College of Surgeons in Ireland as the Baggot Street Hospital in 1832. In the early years of the hospital attending consultant surgeons included the anatomist John Houston.

The hospital was extended and the current façade of red brick and terracotta tiles was added, based on the designs of Albert Edward Murray, in 1893. It was renamed the Royal City of Dublin Hospital following a visit by Princess Alexandra in 1900.

After services were transferred to St. James's Hospital, the hospital closed in 1986. Although the building continued to be used for community services, the Health Service Executive decided in March 2019 to make renewed efforts to dispose of it. The Health Service Executive indicated that it intends to lease back part of the building in order to ensure continued provision of primary care services.

References

Hospital buildings completed in 1832
Hospitals in Dublin (city)
Hospitals established in 1832
Defunct hospitals in the Republic of Ireland
1986 disestablishments in Ireland
Hospitals disestablished in 1986